Beidweiler is a village in the commune of Junglinster, in central Luxembourg.  , the village has a population of 243 inhabitants.

Beidweiler is the site of the 2000 kilowatt-transmitter for transmitting the French-speaking programme of RTL.

References

Junglinster
Villages in Luxembourg